The 2nd Nuestra Belleza México pageant, was held at the Teatro Morelos of Toluca, Estado de México, Mexico on October 22, 1995. Thirty-two contestants of the Mexican Republic competed for the national title, which was won by Vanessa Guzmán from Chihuahua, who later competed at Miss Universe 1996 in US where she was finalist in the Top 6. Guzmán was crowned by outgoing Nuestra Belleza México titleholder Luz María Zetina. She is the first blonde and only Chihuahuense to win this title.

The Nuestra Belleza Mundo México title was won by Alejandra Quintero from Nuevo León, who later competed at Miss World 1995 in South Africa where she was a semi-finalist in the Top 10. Quintero was crowned by outgoing Nuestra Belleza México titleholder Luz María Zetina. She was the first Neoleonesa to win this title.

This year the Nuestra Belleza México Organization negotiated the license of international Miss World contest. The contest Nuestra Belleza México is strengthened by offering their candidates two options for participating in the events of greater global significance: Miss Universe and Miss World. This year, Lupita Jones won the Miss World franchise and the right to send representatives to this event.

Results

Placements

Preliminary competition
The Preliminary Competition was held at the Teatro Morelos of Toluca, Estado de México, Mexico on October 21, 1995. Prior to the final telecast, all contestants competed in swimsuit and evening gown during the preliminary competition, included National Costume competition. The opening number was a parade in state costume.

The Preliminary Competition was hosted by Raúl Velasco.

Placements

Contestants

Judges
They were the same Judges at the Preliminary and Final Competition.
Federico Pizarro – Bullfighter
Beatriz Calles – Events Organiser
Luis José Santander – Actor
Martha Cristiana Merino – Miss Mexico International 1986, Model & Actress
Carlos Marcovich – Filmmaker
Irán Eory – Actress
Juan José Guerra – Politician
Raquel Goujón – Beauty Consultant
Saul Lisazo – Actor

Miss Dorian Grey competition
This was an internal competition, as part of the Steps to Fame award in Nuestra Belleza México. The title was won by Katya Michel from San Luis Potosí and was crowned by the outgoing Miss Dorian Grey titleholder Elizabeth Carvajal.

The musical part was enlivened by the group Garibaldi.

Placements

Judges
 Gerardo Rebollo – Fashion Coordinator
 José Luis Abarca – Fashion Designer
 Cecilia Cervera – Miss Dorian Grey 1988
 Martha De la Vega – Cosmetologist
 Cecilia Gisperr – Dorian Grey's Brand Manager
 Ana Patricia Rojo – Actress
 Rafael Rojas – Actor

References

External links
 Official Website

.México
1995 in Mexico
1995 beauty pageants